"Never Alone" is a song by American singer Tori Kelly. The track was released as the lead single from her second studio album, Hiding Place, on August 24, 2018. The song was written by Kelly and Kirk Franklin. It was Kelly's first number one song on the US Billboard Hot Gospel Songs chart.

Accolades
The single won a Grammy Award for Best Gospel Performance/Song at the 2019 Grammy Awards.

Charts

Weekly charts

Year-end charts

References

2018 songs
2018 singles
Tori Kelly songs
Gospel songs
Capitol Records singles
Schoolboy Records singles